Jarya, also called jariyah and jawaris, was a term for a certain type of slave girl in the medieval Islamic world. They were "slaves for pleasure" (muṭʿa, ladhdha) or “slave-girls for sexual intercourse” (jawārī al-waṭ), who had received special training in artistic skills. In contrast to the Qiyan, however, they normally did not perform for other men than the man in whose harem they were placed.

History
The slave category and of the Jarya - similar to the qiyan - rose to fame during the Abbasid Caliphate era, possibly because free Arab women became more and more secluded from society during this time period.

They were acquired from the slave market or captured as war booty. The term were applied to such slave girls who, by instruction or self education, acquired a great knowledge of artistic skills and intellectual knowledge by which they could entertain a man, rather than by sexuality and physical beauty. They could study issues from music and poetry to religion, history and literature, and many were known to be able to entertain their owner by both intellectual as well as musical abilities.  There were many examples of jaryas with good education who managed to gain influence over male rulers.

The jawaris differed from qiyan in that they appear not to perform in public, only in the harem to which they belonged. Royal harems could employ a very large number of jawaris, who acted as the entertainers of the royal harem and who were not necessarily synonymous with the concubines of the ruler. The Abbasid harem had thousands of jawaris as well as concubines who were not always the same, and this was adopted by the harems of many other Islamic rulers, such as the rulers of the Caliphate of Cordoba and the Fatimid Caliphate.

The jaraya category of sexual harem slaves were described by the 9th-century writer Al-Jahiz, who accused them of exerting a destructive influence over their owners created by their artistic skills, which created a web of dependent feelings such as love (hub), passion (hawa) affinity (mushakala) and a wish for continued companionship (ilf).

Examples
There were many famous jaryas noted in Islamic literature and history, such as Al-Khayzuran, Alam al-Malika and Hababah.

See also
 Cariye
 Qiyan

References

Islam and slavery

Arabic-language women poets
Arabic-language poets
History of slavery
Arabian slaves and freedmen
Slavery in the Abbasid Caliphate
Slavery in the Umayyad Caliphate
Sexual slavery